The Journal of Agricultural Science is a peer-reviewed scientific journal covering research on agriculture and the use of land resources. It was established in 1905 by Rowland Biffen, Alfred Daniel Hall, Thomas Barlow Wood, and Thomas Hudson Middleton and is published by Cambridge University Press.

References

External links 
 
 Print: 
 Electronic: 

Agricultural journals
Publications established in 1905
Cambridge University Press academic journals
English-language journals
1905 establishments in the United Kingdom